Dead Lovers' Sarabande (Face One) is the fourth album by darkwave band Sopor Aeternus & the Ensemble of Shadows, and was released in 1999. It is the first concept album by the band, and the first of a two-album suite detailing the mourning of a lover who has recently passed. (Face One) was also the first Sopor Aeternus album to be released in multiple formats, including a double vinyl edition and an A5-sized boxed set edition; both were limited pressings, of 500 and 3,000 copies, respectively. It was also the first to be promoted with an accompanying video.

Overview
Dead Lovers' Sarabande, as a whole, is a transitory death suite detailing the unnamed protagonist's mourning of her lover and her desire to rejoin him in the afterlife. Major recurring themes in the work include loneliness and the dreadful feeling of loss when someone dear dies. The story of the first part centers around Cantodea assisting her husband in committing suicide; although he is said to be suffering, the exact cause is not mentioned. In "Hades "Pluton"", she attempts to make a deal with otherworldly beings in order to recover her husband but refuses it eventually. Anna-Varney Cantodea later admitted that Dead Lovers' Sarabande was dedicated to, but not about, the late Rozz Williams, former frontman of deathrock band Christian Death.

Musically, a shift was made towards folk music and chamber pieces, with more prominent passages for string instruments. For the first time, live brass and woodwinds players were used instead of synthesized instruments; the leap to organic strings occurred on The inexperienced Spiral Traveller. Whereas previous albums contained some wall of sound production techniques, (Face One) was more intimate and featured minimalist arrangements. Songs also became more drone-like, with the use of pedal tones and repeated melodies carried across several instruments; this is most notable on opener "Across the Bridge" and the album's longest piece, "The Sleeper". "Hades "Pluton"" is based on the rhythm of the Roky Erickson song, "Night of the Vampire".

Dead Lovers' Sarabande (Face One) was re-released on CD with newly packaged artwork in 2004.

Track listing

Personnel
 Katrin Ebert: Violin
 Martin Höfert: Cello
 Johannes Knirsch: Double bass
 Eric Santie-Laa: Cor anglais
 Peter Hergert: Trumpet, trombone
 Eugene de la Fontaine: Tuba, oboe
 Martin Hoffman: Guitars
 Anna-Varney Cantodea: Vocals, all other instruments and programming

References

Dead Lovers Sarabande Face One
Dead Lovers Sarabande Face One